2011 censuses were conducted in the following countries:

 Australia: Census in Australia
 Austria: Demographics of Austria
 Bangladesh: 2011 Bangladesh Census
 Bulgaria: Demographics of Bulgaria
 Canada: Canada 2011 Census
 Croatia: 2011 Census of Croatia
 Czech Republic: 2011 Census of the Czech Republic
 Estonia: 2011 Estonia Census
 European Union: 2011 EU census
 Faroe Island: 2011 Faroe Island census
 Germany: 2011 German Census
 Greece: Greek 2011 Census
 India: 2011 Indian census
 Ireland: Census of Ireland 2011
 Italy: 2011 Italian Census
 Kosovo: 2011 Census of Kosovo
 Latvia: Demographics of Latvia
 Montenegro: 2011 Census of Montenegro
 Namibia: Namibia 2011 Population and Housing Census
 Nepal: Demographics of Nepal
 New Zealand: 2011 New Zealand census
 Poland: Polish census of 2011
 Portugal: Demographics of Portugal
 Romania: 2011 Romanian census
 Slovakia: Demographics of Slovakia
 South Africa: South African National Census of 2011
 Sri Lanka: 2011 Sri Lankan Census
 Ukraine: 2011 Ukrainian Census
 United Kingdom: 2011 United Kingdom census